Gangnam, sometimes referred to as the Greater Gangnam Area, is a geographic and cultural region in Seoul, South Korea. The region is generally defined as including the city's affluent Gangnam, Seocho, and Songpa districts. Historically, the region was also called Yeongdong and remained undeveloped prior to the state-led urban development of the 1960s. Gangnam can also refer to the commercial districts developed around Gangnam Highway and Gangnam station, which are considered one of the most expensive retail markets in the world.

History 

Prior to the incorporation of Gangnam into the city of Seoul in 1963, Seoul was considered to be made up of the area north of the Han River, with the Gangnam region being considered part of outer Seoul. The swampy region was originally home to various poor farming households living in traditional thatched roof Korean homes, with most land use being used for paddy fields and other low-value agriculture. In addition, the region's lowland geographical features made it vulnerable to flooding, thus excluding Gangnam from prior development plans. 

Military dictator Park Chung-hee favored development south of the river to counteract housing shortages and urban sprawl north of the river. By the late 1960s, migration from the countryside into Seoul had overwhelmed the city's existing infrastructure and various proposals were made to expand the city to the south. Following the 1968 assassination attempt on Park Chung-hee by North Korean soldiers, Park announced plans to build a "second Seoul" south of the river to disperse the population away from the Korean Demilitarized Zone. At the time, Gangnam was distanced from the traditional central business districts of Jongro to the north and Yeouido to the west.

Between 1963 and 1979, land prices in Gangnam would increase nearly 1000 times, while land prices in Gangbuk increased 25 times in the same period. In the early 1980s, the Park government enacted the Gangbuk Suppression Policies which restricted the new construction of businesses, entertainment venues, factories, and department stores north of the river. New residential construction in the Gangnam area were sold off by the government through a lottery program at below market rates. These lotteries were highly competitive and restricted to middle-class Koreans as a result of their strict financial restrictions. During this time, intense media attention was brought against middle-class housewives who participated in the real estate market with the use of the pejorative term bok-buin. Competition for the lottery was intensified by the fact that lottery entrants typically entered the names of other family members and because winners could resell their tickets at full market value, resulting in high levels of speculative investment into the region. By 1985, 89 percent of Gangnam's residents had moved within the last five years, in comparison to 30 percent for the rest of Seoul.

Before the 1970s, most prestigious schools in Seoul were located north of the river. As part of the development program in Gangnam, the government provided construction and land subsidies, as well as tax exemptions to schools that moved south of the river, hoping to attract parents to move for their children's educations. As well, the Park government passed the High School Equalization Policy which ended rankings and entrance exams for elite high schools, encouraging these schools to move to Gangnam to regain their reputations. In 1975, Seoul National University relocated from Gangbuk to Gangnam and in 1976, Kyunggi High School, the highest ranked high school in Seoul moved as well. During the following years, a number of elite high schools would move to the Gangnam area, giving the region its reputation as an educational mecca. The migration of these schools to south of the river have been described as the primary reason behind Gangnam's current affluent status. In 1995, the Supreme Court of Korea, the Supreme Prosecutor's Office, and the National Intelligence Service moved to Gangnam from their previous locations north of the river.

Economy 
Wealth is highly concentrated in Gangnam, with the Gangnam and Seocho districts having the greatest proportion of high-income households in Seoul. More than half of all lawyers, doctors, entrepreneurs, financial managers, and civil servants in South Korea live in Gangnam.

Gangnam hosts many startup companies and some of the largest South Korean technology companies, particularly along the Teheran Valley. A number of chaebols are headquartered in Gangnam, including the Hyundai Motor Group, the Samsung Group, the GS Group, and the Lotte Corporation. In addition, the LG Corporation and the KB Financial Group are headquartered in the Yeongdeungpo District, on the western part of the region south of the Han River. In 2010, the Gangnam, Seocho, and Songpa districts accounted for ten percent of the total land value of South Korea. The region also serves as the headquarters for a number of major K-pop entertainment agencies including SM Entertainment and JYP Entertainment.

Arts and culture 
In Korean popular culture, Gangnam is positioned as both the object of aspiration and a region that draws reproval for the perceived corrupt and immoral ways in which its residents acquired their wealth. The boundaries of Gangnam are often defined by its affluence and residents of Gangnam have been found to only recognize parts of Seoul with a standard of living similar or higher than their own to be part of Gangnam. The region has been described as a "gated community" with residents chastising other parts of Seoul as being 'old-fashioned' and 'unsophisticated.' Similarly, studies of Gangnam children have found that they hold negative views of non-Gangnam areas, describing them as "rough, dirty, countrified, smelly, and somewhat dangerous." Living is Gangnam is considered a status symbol, with both businesses and people actively seeking out the region as a means of exhibiting one's success. Although negative attitudes towards Gangnam residents are common among non-Gangnam residents, surveys have found most would still move to Gangnam if they were able to.

Gangnam is sometimes divided into Taebuk and Taenam, referring to the regions north and south of the Teheran Boulevard respectively. Residents from the northern half are characterized as old money and the families of chaebols, while residents from the southern half are characterized as working professionals and overly concerned over their children's education as a result of their background. The real estate market frequently uses Gangnam to refer to solely the Taebuk neighborhood in the northern half of Gangnam District.

The region has a high concentration of luxury brands, with the highest concentration in the Cheongdam neighborhood. The flagship stores of the Shinsagae, Hyundai, and Lotte department stores can all be found in the Gangnam region. More than 470 plastic surgery clinics are registered in Gangnam district, making up more than 30 percent of all clinics in the country.

In the 2012 K-pop song "Gangnam Style", the singer PSY parodied the cultural, lifestyle, and class distinctions associated with the nouveau riche of the Gangnam region. While the music video features the ASEM Tower and Trade Tower in Gangnam, most of the video was filmed outside of Seoul in Incheon. The 2015 action film Gangnam Blues followed the real estate development of the Gangnam area.

Education 
Some of the most prestigious high schools and hagwons in South Korea are found in Gangnam. Gangnam has a disproportionate number of hagwons for its population, having nearly 25 percent of all hagwons in Seoul. In particular, the Daechi neighborhood of Gangnam has more than 900 hagwons, the densest number in the country. Of the students accepted into Seoul National University in 2022, 11.9 percent graduated from schools in the Gangnam and Seocho districts of Seoul. In addition, the Gangnam area has the highest proportion of residents with a bachelor's degree in Seoul, with the vast majority of residents having at least a bachelor's degree.

Politics 

Since the democratization of South Korea and the 1997 Asian financial crisis, Gangnam has gradually shifted towards the right, and the region is considered more politically conservative than the rest of Seoul. The region has historically voted for the right-wing Liberty Korea Party and its successor, the People Power Party. A disproportionate number of government officials appointed under the Lee Myung-bak and Yoon Suk-yeol administrations have been from Gangnam. The region has the highest voter turnout in Seoul. Voters in Gangnam are intensely concerned with protecting and increasing property values, the result of the density of high-value properties in the area.

Liberals who reside in Gangnam are often called the pejorative term "Gangnam Leftist" for their outward progressive political positions that contrast with their class interests as residents of Gangnam. While the term is generally used to describe South Korean liberal politicians like former Justice Minister Cho Kuk who was convicted of corruption, its use has expanded to describe politicians outside of Korea as well, being used to describe both Joe Biden and Emmanuel Macron.

Transportation 
Gangnam has the greatest number of connections on the Seoul Metropolitan Subway, a product of Park Chung-hee's targeted development in the region.

See also 
 Economic inequality in South Korea
 Education in South Korea
 Fashion in South Korea
 Haeundae District – purported to be the Gangnam of Busan
 Suseong District

Notes

References

External links 

Regions of Korea
Geography of Seoul
Gangdong District
Songpa District
Gangnam District
Seocho District